Nikolaos Melanofeidis is a Greek former swimmer. He competed in the men's 100 metre backstroke and the water polo tournament at the 1948 Summer Olympics.

References

External links
 

Year of birth missing
Possibly living people
Greek male swimmers
Greek male water polo players
Olympic swimmers of Greece
Olympic water polo players of Greece
Swimmers at the 1948 Summer Olympics
Water polo players at the 1948 Summer Olympics
Place of birth missing (living people)
Male backstroke swimmers
20th-century Greek people